Protichneumon is a genus of parasitoid wasps belonging to the family Ichneumonidae.

The species of this genus are found in Europe, Japan and Northern America.

Species:
 Protichneumon charlottae Heinrich, 1966 
 Protichneumon chinensis (Uchida, 1937)

References

Ichneumonidae
Ichneumonidae genera